Tofanma or Tofamna is a poorly documented Papuan language of Indonesia. Wurm (1975) placed it as an independent branch of Trans–New Guinea, but Ross (2005) could not find enough evidence to classify it. It appears to be related to Namla, a neighboring language.

Vocabulary
Tofanma vocabulary from Foley (2018):

{| class="wikitable sortable"
! gloss !! Tofanma
|-
| ‘bird’ || yetai
|-
| ‘blood’ || læki
|-
| ‘bone’ || da
|-
| ‘breast’ || mu
|-
| ‘ear’ || kemblale
|-
| ‘eat’ || dimisipe
|-
| ‘egg’ || li
|-
| ‘eye’ || yei
|-
| ‘fire’ || ve
|-
| ‘give’ || vænə
|-
| ‘go’ || wao
|-
| ‘ground’ || yai
|-
| ‘hair’ || kemblena
|-
| ‘hear’ || varli
|-
| ‘I’ || ne
|-
| ‘leg’ || wukudaʔ
|-
| ‘louse’ || bili
|-
| ‘man’ || lamle
|-
| ‘moon’ || min-yaku
|-
| ‘name’ || ame
|-
| ‘one’ || kenanu
|-
| ‘road, path’ || mæki
|-
| ‘see’ || mæsi
|-
| ‘sky’ || nəmlo
|-
| ‘stone’ || kəlo
|-
| ‘sun’ || yaku
|-
| ‘tongue’ || kuguku
|-
| ‘tooth’ || dimi
|-
| ‘tree’ || la
|-
| ‘two’ || næni
|-
| ‘water’ || basu
|-
| ‘we’ || ngu
|-
| ‘woman’ || ale
|-
| ‘you (sg)’ || wo
|-
| ‘you (pl)’ || dule
|}

The following basic vocabulary words are from Voorhoeve (1971, 1975), as cited in the Trans-New Guinea database:

{| class="wikitable sortable"
! gloss !! Tofanma
|-
! head
| kemble
|-
! hair
| kemble-na
|-
! ear
| kemb lelu
|-
! eye
| jei; yei
|-
! nose
| məniti
|-
! tooth
| geme
|-
! tongue
| goŋgogok
|-
! leg
| wanta
|-
! louse
| bli
|-
! bird
| jetai; yetai
|-
! egg
| taili
|-
! blood
| leki
|-
! bone
| nta
|-
! skin
| jefake; yefake
|-
! breast
| mo
|-
! tree
| kili
|-
! man
| lame
|-
! woman
| ale
|-
! sun
| jaku; yaku
|-
! moon
| menti-gaku
|-
! water
| basu
|-
! fire
| we
|-
! stone
| klo
|-
! road, path
| meka
|-
! name
| emi
|-
! eat
| sembe
|-
! one
| kenano
|-
! two
| neni
|}

References 

Wambaliau, Theresia. 2005. Survey Report on the Tofanma Language in Papua, Indonesia. (in Indonesian). Unpublished manuscript. Jayapura: SIL Indonesia.

External links

Tofanma word list at TransNewGuinea.org

Languages of western New Guinea
Namla–Tofanma languages